The family Limacodidae is mostly tropical, but has two representatives in Great Britain:

 Apoda limacodes, festoon — south, east (not south-west) (Nationally Scarce B)
 Heterogenea asella, triangle — south, east (Red Data Book)

See also
List of moths of Great Britain (overview)
Family lists: Hepialidae, Cossidae, Zygaenidae, Limacodidae, Sesiidae, Lasiocampidae, Saturniidae, Endromidae, Drepanidae, Thyatiridae, Geometridae, Sphingidae, Notodontidae, Thaumetopoeidae, Lymantriidae, Arctiidae, Ctenuchidae, Nolidae, Noctuidae and Micromoths

References 
 Waring, Paul, Martin Townsend and Richard Lewington (2003) Field Guide to the Moths of Great Britain and Ireland. British Wildlife Publishing, Hook, UK. .

Moths of Great Britain (Limacodidae)